J. Percy Priest Lake is a reservoir in north central part of Tennessee. It is formed by J. Percy Priest Dam, located between miles six and seven of the Stones River. The lake and dam are named for Congressman Percy Priest.

The site of the former town of Old Jefferson was inundated by the reservoir; the community was demolished in the early 1960s for the building of the dam.

The Percy Priest dam project was first authorized by the U.S. Congress in 1946 under the name "Stewarts Ferry Reservoir." An act of Congress approved July 2, 1958, changed the name to honor Congressman Priest. The U.S. Army Corps of Engineers project was completed in 1967.

The dam, powerhouse, lake and public lands are operated and supervised by the Corps of Engineers' Nashville District personnel. The Natural Resource Management Office maintains three campgrounds (Anderson Road, Seven Points and Poole Knobs), eleven day-use/picnic areas (Anderson Road, Cook, Damsite, East Fork, Fate Sanders, Jefferson Springs, Nice's Mill, Overlook, Seven Points, Smith Springs and Tailwater) and twelve boat launching ramps (Anderson Road, Cook, East Fork, Fall Creek, Fate Sanders, Hurricane Creek, Jefferson Springs, Lamar Hill, Mona, Nice's Mill, Poole Knobs, Seven Points, Smith Springs, Stewart's Creek and Viverett Creek). Marinas at the lake include Nashville Shores, Elm Hill, Four Corners, Fate Sanders, Hamilton Creek and Percy Priest.  The lake is also home to a number of recreational organizations such as the Tennessee Boat Club, Percy Priest Yacht Club, Vanderbilt Sailing Club, the Vanderbilt Rowing Club and the Nashville Rowing Club.

The lake is mentioned in the song "Cover Me Up" by musician Jason Isbell, and later in a cover sung by Morgan Wallen.

On May 29, 2021, a Cessna Citation I/SP private jet crashed into the lake, killing all seven on board, including actor Joe Lara and Christian author and dietician Gwen Shamblin Lara.

References

External links

Images

Protected areas of Davidson County, Tennessee
Reservoirs in Tennessee
Protected areas of Rutherford County, Tennessee
Protected areas of Wilson County, Tennessee
Bodies of water of Davidson County, Tennessee
Bodies of water of Wilson County, Tennessee
Smyrna, Tennessee
1967 establishments in Tennessee